Charlotte R. Lane (born August 12, 1947) is an American attorney and politician from the state of West Virginia. She is a member of the Republican Party.

Early life and education 
Lane is a native of Pleasants County, West Virginia. She moved to Charleston, West Virginia, in 1973. Lane earned a Bachelor of Arts degree in political science and journalism from Marshall University and a Juris Doctor from the West Virginia University College of Law.

Career

Charlotte Lane served in the West Virginia House of Delegates throughout the 1990s and was later appointed  as chair the West Virginia Public Service Commission. In 1987, she served as the United States attorney on an interim basis. In 2004, President George W. Bush appointed Lane to the United States International Trade Commission.

Personal life 
Lane was diagnosed with multiple sclerosis in 1981.

References

Living people
1947 births
People from Pleasants County, West Virginia
Republican Party members of the West Virginia House of Delegates
International Trade Commission personnel
People with multiple sclerosis
West Virginia lawyers
Women state legislators in West Virginia
21st-century American women
Marshall University alumni
West Virginia University College of Law alumni